Richard Strang (19 March 1900 – 15 February 1971) was a Scottish footballer who made 301 appearances in the English Football League playing as a centre half for Crystal Palace, Halifax Town, Northampton Town and Darlington in the 1920s and 1930s. He began his professional career with Birmingham, but never represented that club in competitive first-team football, and also played non-league football for Poole and Worcester City.

Life and career
Strang was born in Rutherglen. He was playing for a junior club in Glasgow when English First Division club Birmingham beat off competition to sign him in September 1923. He never appeared for Birmingham's first team, and was allowed to leave the club on a free transfer the following May for Third Division South team Crystal Palace. Described in the Derby Daily Telegraph as a "lean and lanky" centre-half with competence in both the defensive and the creative aspects of his role – "a rare breaker-up and knows a thing or two about feeding his forwards" – Strang had progressed well with Palace and become a regular in the team when, in October 1925, he and forward Bill Hand were charged with breach of contract in respect of training requirements and given two weeks' notice to leave the club.

He initially signed for Poole of the Western League, then moved into the Birmingham & District League with Worcester City. He scored once in league competition, and also scored the winning goal in the semi-final of the 1927 Worcestershire Senior Cup against Stourbridge; Worcester lost to Cradley Heath in the final after a replay.

Strang returned to the Football League with Halifax Town of the Third Division North in 1929. He played 99 league matches over three seasons, and his "heroic" performance in an FA Cup tie in 1931 made a major contribution to the struggling club's survival. In those days, progress in the FA Cup provided a significant income stream, and in 1931, the club was on the verge of financial failure. Drawn away to Newark Town in the first round, Halifax conceded an early goal, but after Newark lost a man to injury, they equalised by half-time. The second half was a rearguard action as Halifax clung on to the draw, and then won the replay and their second-round tie before losing in the third round:

His services were not retained at the end of the 1931–32 season, and he and Halifax teammate John McFarlane moved on to Northampton Town. Strang was little used in Northampton's first team, and in the summer of 1933, he joined Darlington, for whom he played 171 matches in the Third Division North before finishing his senior career in 1938.

Strang died in Darlington, County Durham, in 1971 at the age of 70.

References

1900 births
1971 deaths
Sportspeople from Rutherglen
Scottish footballers
Association football defenders
Birmingham City F.C. players
Crystal Palace F.C. players
Poole Town F.C. players
Worcester City F.C. players
Halifax Town A.F.C. players
Northampton Town F.C. players
Darlington F.C. players
English Football League players
Western Football League players
Footballers from South Lanarkshire